René Thévenet (1926–1998) was a French film producer. He was a member of the jury at the 1973 Berlin Film Festival and the 1982 Cannes Film Festival. He was the elder brother of the film historian Pierre Lherminier.

Selected filmography
 Thirteen at the Table (1955)
 Mannequins of Paris (1956)
 Les Collégiennes (1957)
 Mademoiselle Strip-tease (1957)
 Casino de Paris (1957)
 Daniella by Night (1961)
 Caesar the Conqueror (1962)
 The Killing Game (1967)
 Goto, Island of Love (1968)
 The Witness (1969)

References

Bibliography
 Ford, Charles & Hammond, Robert. Polish Film: A Twentieth Century History. McFarland, 2005.
 Kinnard, Roy & Crnkovich, Tony. Italian Sword and Sandal Films, 1908–1990. McFarland, 2017.
 Marie, Michel. The French New Wave: An Artistic School. John Wiley & Sons, 2008.

External links

1926 births
1998 deaths
People from Oullins
French film producers